The American Le Mans Series raced on 27 different circuits during  its 15-year history. Four tracks: Mazda Raceway Laguna Seca, Canadian Tire Motorsport Park, Road Atlanta, and Sebring International Raceway; hosted an event in each year of the series.

In its early years, the series visited rovals at Charlotte, Las Vegas, and Texas, but the last of these events was held in 2001.  The ALMS held events on 8 temporary street circuits, although only Long Beach lasted  more than 3 years.

In 2000, the series raced in Europe, at the Nürburgring and Silverstone, as a precursor to the 2001 European Le Mans Series season.  Two more European races (Donington and Jarama) were joint events with the ELMS in 2001.  The Adelaide event in 2000 was also planned as a precursor to an Asia-Pacific Le Mans Series which never materialized.  From 2002, the series only visited circuits in the United States and Canada.

Circuits from the last year (2013) are shown in bold.

Track held two races in 1999, 2003, and 2005.  Count does not include the 1998 Petit Le Mans.

External links
2012 event schedule
Racing Sports Cars ALMS archive

 
American Le Mans Series
American Le Mans Series